The Progressive Conservative Association of Nova Scotia leadership election of 2006 was held on February 11, 2006 to select a replacement for John Hamm, as Premier of Nova Scotia and leader of the Progressive Conservative Association of Nova Scotia.

Timeline

September 29, 2005 - Hamm announces his retirement, effective upon the election of a new leader.
October 15, 2005 - The PC Party announces that the leadership vote will be held on February 11, 2006 with a delegated convention as opposed to the one member one vote system used in the previous race.
October 26, 2005 - Bill Black becomes the first candidate to officially enter the race.
October 28, 2005 - Neil LeBlanc becomes the second candidate to officially enter the race.
November 4, 2005 - Rodney MacDonald becomes the third candidate to officially enter the race.
December 27, 2005 - Membership cutoff date.
January 7, 2006 - Delegate selection period begins.
February 11, 2006 - Leadership convention held in Halifax.  Rodney MacDonald wins on 2nd ballot with support from Neil LeBlanc.
February 24, 2006 - MacDonald sworn in as 32nd Premier of Nova Scotia.

Candidates

Bill Black, former CEO of Maritime Life and candidate for the Halifax Citadel by-election
Neil LeBlanc, former minister of Finance
Rodney MacDonald, minister of Tourism, Culture & Heritage and MLA for Inverness

Non-candidates

The following individuals were the subject of media speculation about running or themselves indicated they were considering a run but eventually opted against.

Michael Baker, minister of Justice and MLA for Lunenburg
Jamie Baillie, former Chief of Staff to Premier Hamm.
Cecil Clarke, minister of Energy and MLA for Cape Breton North
Ernie Fage, minister of Economic Development and MLA for Cumberland North
Richard Hurlburt, minister of Natural Resources and MLA for Yarmouth
Peter Kelly, mayor of Halifax
Peter MacKay, deputy leader of the Conservative Party of Canada and MP for Central Nova
Kerry Morash, minister of Environment and Labour and MLA for Queens
Jane Purves, former minister of Education, Chief of Staff to Premier Hamm
Judy Streatch, MLA for Chester-St. Margaret's

Results

First Ballot

The first ballot was close, with just 59 votes separating the first and last place candidates.

LeBlanc eliminated, supports MacDonald.

Second Ballot

External links
Hamm's resignation announcement
Party website

Political party leadership elections in Nova Scotia
Nova Scotia Progressive Conservative
2006 in Nova Scotia
2006 political party leadership elections